The 2018–19 Eastern Counties Football League was the 76th season in the history of Eastern Counties Football League, a football competition in England. The season saw Division One divided into two sections.

Premier Division

The Premier Division featured 16 clubs which competed in the division last season, along with four new clubs:
 Framlingham Town, promoted from Division One
 Norwich United, relegated from the Isthmian League
 Whitton United, promoted from Division One
 Woodbridge Town, promoted from Division One

League table

Stadia and locations

Division One North

It was the first season Division One was split into two sections. Division One North featured 12 clubs which competed in Division One last season, along with seven new clubs.
Clubs relegated or demoted from the Premier Division:
Fakenham Town
Haverhill Borough
Ipswich Wanderers
Clubs promoted from the Anglian Combination:
Harleston Town
Mulbarton Wanderers
Plus:
Felixstowe & Walton United reserves, joined from the Reserve Division
Lakenheath, promoted from the Cambridgeshire County League

League table

Stadia and locations

Division One South (Eastern Senior League) 

It was the first season Division One was split into two sections. Division One South featured four clubs which competed in Division One last season, along with 15 new clubs.
Clubs relegated from the Essex Senior League:
Burnham Ramblers
Hackney Wick
Clubs joined from the Essex Olympian League:
Benfleet
Frenford
May & Baker
Newbury Forest
White Ensign
Clubs joined from the Essex and Suffolk Border League:
Brightlingsea Regent reserves
Coggeshall United
Harwich & Parkeston
Plus:
Fire United, joined from the Middlesex County League
Hashtag United, new club
Lopes Tavares, joined from the Essex Alliance Football League
Wivenhoe Town, relegated from the Premier Division
Wormley Rovers, joined from the Hertfordshire Senior County League

League table

Stadia and locations

References

External links
 Eastern Counties Football League

Eastern Counties Football League seasons
9